Bala Singh (7 May 195227 November 2019) was an Indian actor who appeared in Tamil language films. After making his debut in Nassar's Avatharam (1995), he appeared as the antagonist in over a hundred films.

Early life and career 
Bala Singh was born in Kaliyakkavilai, near Marthandam in Kanyakumari District.

Bala Singh initially began his career featuring in stage plays and trained with the National School of Drama, before being handed his first film role in Nassar's Avatharam (1995). He played the role of the chief antagonist, Baasi, an expelled troupe member and won critical acclaim for his performance in the film. He has since played supporting roles in films directed by Shankar, Mani Ratnam and Kamal Haasan, often playing the role of villain.

In 2009, he played a lead role of a grandfather in Vannathupoochi, in a film which explored the relationship between grandparents and their grandchildren.

Death
On 27 November 2019, he died at Chennai due to Cardiac arrest.

Filmography

Tamil films

Malayalam films

Telugu films

Television
Soolam (2002–2004)
Rudhraveenai (2003–2004)
Raja Rajeshwari (2004-2007)
Nalla Neram (2013–2014)
Aathira (2015–2016)
 Keladi Kanmani (2017)
 Vanathai Pola (2020) (Photo Appearance)

References

External links 
 

Male actors in Tamil cinema
Male actors in Malayalam cinema
People from Kanyakumari district
Indian male film actors
Male actors from Chennai
1952 births
2019 deaths